Town Line Church and Cemetery is a historic church and cemetery located at Cameron Mills in Steuben County, New York.  It is a small frame building constructed in 1845 in a vernacular Greek Revival style.  A cemetery surrounds the church and contains upwards of 3,030 burials with markers dating to the 1830s.

It was listed on the National Register of Historic Places in 2000.

Gallery

References

Churches on the National Register of Historic Places in New York (state)
Cemeteries on the National Register of Historic Places in New York (state)
Neoclassical architecture in New York (state)
Churches completed in 1845
19th-century churches in the United States
Churches in Steuben County, New York
Cemeteries in Steuben County, New York
National Register of Historic Places in Steuben County, New York
Neoclassical church buildings in the United States